Base36 is a binary-to-text encoding scheme that represents binary data in an ASCII string format by translating it into a radix-36 representation. The choice of 36 is convenient in that the digits can be represented using the Arabic numerals 0–9 and the Latin letters A–Z (the ISO basic Latin alphabet).

Each base36 digit needs less than 6 bits of information to be represented.

Conversion 

Signed 32- and 64-bit integers will only hold at most 6 or 13 base-36 digits, respectively (that many base-36 digits can overflow the 32- and 64-bit integers). For example, the 64-bit signed integer maximum value of "9223372036854775807" is "" in base-36.
Similarly, the 32-bit signed integer maximum value of "2147483647" is "" in base-36.

Standard implementations  
In the Common Lisp standard (ANSI INCITS 226-1994), functions like parse-integer support a radix of 2 to 36.

Java SE supports conversion from/to String to different bases from 2 up to 36.  For example,  and 

Just like Java, JavaScript also supports conversion from/to String to different bases from 2 up to 36. 

PHP, like Java, supports conversion from/to String to different bases from 2 up to 36 using the base_convert function, available since PHP 4.

Go supports conversion to string to different bases from 2 up to 36 using the built-in strconv.FormatInt(), and strconv.FormatUint() functions, and conversions from string encoded in different bases from 2 up to 36 using the built-in strconv.ParseInt(), and strconv.ParseUint() functions.

Python allows conversions of strings from base 2 to base 36.

See also
 
 Uuencoding

References

External links 
 A discussion about the proper name for base 36 at the Wordwizard Clubhouse
 The Prime Lexicon, a list of words that are prime numbers in base 36
 A Binary-Octal-Decimal-Hexadecimal-Base36 converter written in PHP
 A C# base 36 encoder and decoder
 Code sample in C# that demonstrates the HexaTriDecimal Numbering System including string parsing, as well as increment/decrement operations

Binary-to-text encoding formats
Computer arithmetic
Data serialization formats